Iraq Securities Commission, (ISC) is an independent public commission that oversees the activities of licensed securities markets, one of which is the Iraq Stock Exchange.

External links
 Official Iraq Securities Commission homepage

Securities and exchange commissions
Regulation in Iraq